Pokémon Rumble (titled  in Japan) is a beat 'em up video game in the Pokémon series for WiiWare.

Gameplay

The player controls Pokémon as they BOOM battle other Pokémon in a series of linear dungeons and enclosed arenas. The game features real-time melee-based gameplay, which has been likened to that of Smash TV.

The game uses a Wii Remote held sideways by default, but also supports the Nunchuk, Classic Controller (Pro) and GameCube Controller. Using one of the attachment controllers allows two players to share the same Wii Remote. Controllers can be changed at the Multiplayer booth in the Terminal area after finishing the first stage.

The player starts off with a low-level Pokémon with only one attack at their disposal. By battling wild Pokémon through a number of levels the player collects coins which can be used to buy new attacks or recruit more Pokémon. When the player obtains a high enough level Pokémon, the doors to the Battle Royale room open, where they take on dozens of Pokémon at a time in an enclosed arena. The player must defeat all of the Pokémon in order to rank up, eventually facing much stronger and even Legendary Pokémon.

The game supports up to four players simultaneously in co-operative and competitive modes. It also features a password system which unlocks certain Pokémon. Passwords have been found in Nintendo Power magazines, the official game website, or online.

Development
A free demo was available on the Wii Shop Channel. It included a number of functions including: The Normal Introduction, a few stages allowing the player to get the feeling of each stage. Pokémon can be recruited and the Terminal can be used. Once a Pokémon is recruited with Power Points of 100 or more (or they lose all their lives twice) a short video is displayed in which the Battle Royale doors open and then a screenshot appears stating that the demo is over.

Reception

IGN rated the game as 6 out of 10, saying that it is "mindless, but fun", but doesn't have enough depth to keep playing. They went on and criticized the developers for being lazy and reusing models from My Pokémon Ranch. The game received an aggregated score of 59 on Metacritic, based on reviews from 9 critics.

Sequels
On June 10, 2011, the Japanese Pokémon website announced a sequel, Pokémon Rumble Blast. The game was released in Japan on August 11, 2011, for Nintendo 3DS. In 2013, a second sequel for Wii U called Pokémon Rumble U was released. Pokémon Rumble World was released on April 8, 2015, through the Nintendo eShop as a freemium title for Nintendo 3DS. On May 22, 2019, a mobile sequel named Pokémon Rumble Rush was released globally for Android, with its iOS release happening on July 23.

References

External links
 Official website (English)
 Official website (Japanese)

 
2009 video games
Action role-playing video games
Ambrella games
Nintendo franchises
Role-playing video games
Sentient toys in fiction
Video games developed in Japan
Wii games
Wii-only games
WiiWare games